Sect was a Brazilian Eurodance band, formed in 1994, consisting of producers Jorge Tchorta Boratto and Gui Boratto, with Patrícia Coelho. and later Alyssa Cavin as lead vocalist.

It is considered the country's first successful electronic music project. also one of the first Brazilian bands to stand out in the English language in the lyrics of their songs. 

The group became known for the hit and its biggest success, "Follow You (Crazy for You)", from the album Eleven, released in 1994, which was part of the soundtrack of the telenovela História de Amor. The band was successful in Brazilian clubs in the 90s. and was heavily played on the radio. Another relatively successful song was “Wasting My Life”.

History

In 1994, they released the EP "F&D", on the Velas label. It is on this EP that the group recorded the single "Follow You". In 1995, they released the album Eleven. In 1998, Patrícia Coelho was replaced by the vocalist, Alyssa Cavin.

Discography

F & D (1994)
Track list
 Fly
 Follow You
 Dance
 Deep Inside

Eleven (1995)
Track list
 Wasting My Life
 Little Brother
 I Can't Stop Loving You
 Get Away
 Face
 Follow You
 Light
 Walk Away
 Things I Say
 Dance Across The Floor
 Follow You (Club Mix)
 Wasting My Life (Club Mix)

Singles
 Follow You
 Wasting My Life
 I Can't Stop Loving You
 Get Away
 Walk Away
 Face
 Never Know How Much I Love You (1999)
 Can't Stop The World (2002)

References

External links 
http://www.discogs.com/artist/Sect+(2)
http://www.eurokdj.com/search/eurodb.php?name=Sect

Brazilian pop music groups
Eurodance groups
Musical groups established in 1994
English-language musical groups from Brazil